Guillemot may refer to:
 Guillemot, a seabird
 Guillemot Corporation is a French-Canadian company, focused on computer graphics cards
 Joseph Guillemot (1899–1975), French athlete
 Guillemots (band), a British rock band

See also
 Guillemets (« »), punctuation marks